Odd Fellows Hall is a historic Odd Fellows hall located at Alexandria, Virginia. It is a 2 1/2-story, brick building.  It was built in 1864 as a one-story building, and expanded to its present size in 1870.  African-American orders like the black Odd Fellows allowed blacks to socialize and put their skills to good use.  In 1870, black builder and politician George Seaton was hired to build the Odd Fellows meeting hall in Alexandria, Virginia.  For decades the building was used to house the group and many of the social gatherings of the African-American community.  In the 1980s the building was converted into condominiums.  It is a three-story brick building with decorative detailing and a slate mansard roof.  The hall is currently a residential building.

References

External links

Information on the Odd Fellows Hall from Virginia African Heritage Program

Clubhouses on the National Register of Historic Places in Virginia
National Register of Historic Places in Alexandria, Virginia
Odd Fellows buildings in Virginia
Second Empire architecture in Virginia
Cultural infrastructure completed in 1870
Buildings and structures in Alexandria, Virginia